
Gmina Kluki is a rural gmina (administrative district) in Bełchatów County, Łódź Voivodeship, in central Poland.

Villages
Gmina Kluki contains the villages and settlements of Cisza, Imielnia, Kaszewice, Kluki, Kuźnica Kaszewska, Nowy Janów, Osina, Parzno, Podwódka, Roździn, Ścichawa, Strzyżewice, Trząs, Wierzchy Kluckie, Żar, Zarzecze and Żelichów.

Neighbouring gminas
Gmina Kluki is bordered by the gminas of Bełchatów, Kleszczów, Szczerców and Zelów.

References
Polish official population figures 2006

Kluki
Bełchatów County